Belvidere is a historic farm property at 4024 Pace Road in rural Goochland County, Virginia, south of the hamlet of Hadensville.  The property consists of  that are now mainly woodland, with a cleared area near its center with some fields and the farm complex.  The centerpiece of the farm complex is a two-story wood-frame house, whose oldest portion probably dates to the late 18th century.  It was enlarged by a two-story addition in 1821–22, and underwent further alterations in the 19th century before undergoing restoration beginning in 1979.  It is a rare surviving example of 18th-century architecture in the county.

The property was listed on the National Register of Historic Places in 2016.

See also
National Register of Historic Places listings in Goochland County, Virginia

References

Historic districts in Virginia
Houses on the National Register of Historic Places in Virginia
Houses completed in 1861
Houses in Goochland County, Virginia
National Register of Historic Places in Goochland County, Virginia
1861 establishments in Virginia